Shams Tabrizi's tomb in Khoy, beside a tower monument in a memorial park, has been nominated as a World Cultural Heritage Center by UNESCO. The tomb of Shams-i Tabrīzī was recently nominated to be a UNESCO World Heritage Site.

See also
 Shams Tabrizi
 Mevlana Museum
 Rumi
 Haji Bektash Veli

References

 

Populated places in Khoy County
13th-century Iranian people